Sir Fergus McMaster (3 May 1879 – 8 August 1950) was an Australian businessman and aviation pioneer. He was one of the three founders of the Queensland and Northern Territory Aerial Services Limited, the airline company that became commonly known by its acronym, Qantas.

Early life
McMaster was born in Morinish, a town near the city of Rockhampton, Queensland. As a young man, he assisted his brothers as a sheep grazier.  He married Edith Scougall in 1911; she died in 1913. In January 1917 he enlisted in the First Australian Imperial Force and served as a gunner and dispatch rider in France during World War I.

Business

McMaster was named as chairman of Qantas at the company's establishment in 1920 and served in that capacity for all but three of the next 27 years until 1947, when Qantas was taken over by the Australian government. He was knighted in 1941 for his services towards the development and survival of Qantas, and the development of other companies, such as North Australian Worsted & Woollen Mills Ltd and Electric Supply Co., Charters Towers.

Later life
McMaster died in Brisbane on 8 August 1950. His funeral was held on 10 August 1950 at St Andrew's Presbyterian Church, after which he was cremated at Mount Thompson crematorium.

In 2008, Qantas named one its fleet of twelve Airbus A380s (registration VH-OQD) "Fergus McMaster" in recognition of its first chairman's contribution to the aviation industry and particularly to Qantas.

References

Further reading

 

People from Rockhampton
1879 births
1950 deaths
Qantas people
Australian company founders
Australian military personnel of World War I